Krisel may refer to;

 Jonathan Krisel, an American director, producer, and writer
 William Krisel, an American architect, especially known for mid-century modern designs

See also
 Mark Crysell, a New Zealand television presenter and journalist
 Kreisel, a type of turn on some sledding tracks
 Kreisel (surname)